The 1986 European Touring Car Championship, known in 1986 as the FIA Touring Car Championship, was the 24th season of the European Touring Car Championship. The championship was run to the FIA's international Group A touring car regulations.

European Touring Car Championship 
Champion:  Roberto Ravaglia

Runner Up:  Win Percy

Results

Table – Drivers

Table – Manufacturers

References

External links
European Touring Car Championship 1986

European Touring Car Championship seasons
European Touring Car